Dihydromethysticin is one of the six major kavalactones found in the kava plant.

Pharmacology
Dihydromethysticin has marked activity on the induction of CYP3A23, as does the related chemical desmethoxyyangonin.

Both dihydromethysticin and methysticin induce the hepatic enzyme CYP1A1, which increases the amount of the very highly carcinogenic benzo[a]pyrene-7,8-dihydrodiol-9,10-epoxide in the body (via the metabolism of benzo[a]pyrene) and may be responsible for some of the toxic effects associated with kava consumption.

In vitro, dihydromethysticin possesses analgesic, anticonvulsant, and anxiolytic effects. It has been found to act as a GABAA receptor positive allosteric modulator and as an reversible inhibitor of monoamine oxidase B.

References

External links

Kavalactones
Cytochrome P450 inhibitors
GABAA receptor positive allosteric modulators
Monoamine oxidase inhibitors